George Anderson (6 January 1877 – 20 May 1930) was a Scottish professional footballer. He played as a defender and made over 170 appearances for Kilmarnock.

References

Sources

1877 births
1930 deaths
Footballers from Kilmarnock
Scottish footballers
Scotland international footballers
Kilmarnock F.C. players
Scottish Football League players
Scottish Football League representative players
Association football defenders